Galerías Insurgentes, full name Centro Comercial Galerías Insurgentes, is a shopping mall on Insurgentes Sur Avenue at Parroquia in the Actipan neighborhood of Colonia Del Valle, Mexico City.

Background 
In 1992, Galerías Insurgentes opened as a collection of retail shops to complement the existing large Liverpool department store directly to its north. Its design is European, housing a Louvre-style glass pyramid and a towering Longines clock on its facade.

See also 
 Colonia del Valle
 Centro Coyoacán

References

External links 
 https://www.galerias.com/galeriasinsurgentes

Shopping malls in Greater Mexico City
Shopping malls established in 1992
Buildings and structures in Mexico City
Tourist attractions in Mexico City